Joseph Simpson Farland (August 11, 1914 – January 28, 2007) served as United States Ambassador to four countries.

Farland was born in Clarksburg, West Virginia and raised in that city as well as in Punxsutawney, Pennsylvania. He received his bachelors and a law degree from West Virginia University and did further studies at Princeton University and Stanford University. Farland was a practicing lawyer for several years.

During World War II Farland worked with the FBI and then was in the Navy.  After the war besides continuing his law activities Farland also served as president of coal companies. Farland became United States Ambassador to the Dominican Republic in 1957.  He was then appointed Ambassador to Panama in 1960 serving in that post until 1963.  In 1963 Farland returned to practicing law in Washington, D.C. Farland later served as United States Ambassador to Pakistan from 1969 to 1972 and then as Ambassador to Iran from 1972 to 1973. During his term as ambassador to Pakistan, Farland arranged for Henry Kissinger to visit China via Pakistan in 1971. Kissinger's clandestine meeting with Chou En-lai paved the way for President Richard Nixon's own visit to China. Farland was then appointed Ambassador to New Zealand, but did not accept the position and returned to the practice of law. He retired to Winchester, Virginia, where he died on January 28, 2007.

References

External links
 

1914 births
West Virginia University alumni
Princeton University alumni
Stanford University alumni
Ambassadors of the United States to the Dominican Republic
Ambassadors of the United States to Panama
Ambassadors of the United States to Pakistan
Ambassadors of the United States to Iran
2007 deaths
Lawyers from Clarksburg, West Virginia
People from Punxsutawney, Pennsylvania
Lawyers from Washington, D.C.
Federal Bureau of Investigation agents
People of the Indo-Pakistani War of 1971
20th-century American lawyers
20th-century American diplomats